Bernhard Baader was a collector of German folklore in the former Baden, now part of Baden-Württemberg.

Biography
Baader completed his education in 1819 at the Wilhelmsgymnasium in Munich. From 1830 to 1840 he published (as several other authors) texts from German folklore in various newspapers. Parts of his stories were taken by August Schnezler and published in his book Badisches Sagenbuch in 1846.

In 1851, Baader published his 20 years of folklore gathering in his book Volkssagen aus dem Lande Baden und den angrenzenden Gegenden. In 1859 he published a sequel with more folklore.

Works
Volkssagen aus dem Lande Baden und den angrenzenden Gegenden (German)
Neugesammelte Volkssagen aus dem Lande Baden und den angrenzenden Gegenden (German)

External links
 
 
Biography of Baader (German)

1790 births
1859 deaths
Collectors of fairy tales
German folklorists
Year of birth uncertain
Place of death missing
German male non-fiction writers